The 1980 US Open was a tennis tournament played on outdoor hard courts at the USTA National Tennis Center in New York City in New York in the United States. It was the 100th edition of the US Open and was held from August 26 to September 7, 1980.

Seniors

Men's singles

 John McEnroe defeated  Björn Borg 7–6 (7–4), 6–1, 6–7(5–7), 5–7, 6–4
 It was McEnroe's 2nd career Grand Slam singles title and his 2nd consecutive US Open title.

Women's singles

 Chris Evert-Lloyd defeated  Hana Mandlíková 5–7, 6–1, 6–1
 It was Evert-Lloyd's 14th career Grand Slam title and her 5th US Open title.

Men's doubles

 Bob Lutz /  Stan Smith defeated  John McEnroe /  Peter Fleming 7–6, 3–6, 6–1, 3–6, 6–3
 It was Lutz's 5th and last career Grand Slam title and his 4th US Open title. It was Smith's 7th and last career Grand Slam title and his 5th US Open title.

Women's doubles

 Billie Jean King /  Martina Navratilova defeated  Pam Shriver /  Betty Stöve 7–6 (7–2), 7–5
 It was King's 39th and last career Grand Slam title and her 13th US Open title. It was Navratilova's 9th career Grand Slam title and her 3rd US Open title.

Mixed doubles

 Wendy Turnbull /  Marty Riessen defeated  Betty Stöve /  Frew McMillan 7–5, 6–2
 It was Turnbull's 5th career Grand Slam title and her 2nd US Open title. It was Riessen's 9th and last career Grand Slam title and his 5th US Open title.

Juniors

Boys' singles

 Mike Falberg defeated  Eric Wilborts 6–7, 6–3, 6–3

Girls' singles

 Susan Mascarin defeated  Kathrin Keil 6–3, 6–4

Boys' doubles
The tournament began in 1982.

Girls' doubles
The tournament began in 1982.

External links
 Official website

 
 

 
US Open
US Open (tennis) by year
1980 in sports in New York City
1980 in American tennis
August 1980 sports events in the United States
September 1980 sports events in the United States